Matthew Edward Thomas Salisbury (born 18 April 1993) is an English cricketer who plays for Durham County Cricket Club in first-class matches as a righthanded batsman who bowls right arm medium-fast pace.
After several years on the fringes of the Essex XI, he was released in 2015. After a period out of the professional game, he impressed Hampshire CC when playing against their second XI, and he played for them in 2017. 
In July 2018 he was given a two-year contract by Durham CC having performed well during a loan period.

References

External links
 

1993 births
English cricketers
Essex cricketers
Hampshire cricketers
Living people
Sportspeople from Chelmsford
Durham cricketers
Suffolk cricketers
Cambridge MCCU cricketers